Vice Admiral Rajaram Swaminathan is a serving Flag Officer in the Indian Navy. He is currently serving as the Director General Naval Projects(Mumbai). He has previously served as the Admiral Superintendent of Bombay Dockyard and Assistant Chief of Material(modernisation). He has served extensively on board the ship INS Viraat in various capacities. He is an alumnus of IIT Kharagpur, Defence Services Staff College and the National Defence College (India).

He was commissioned into the Indian Navy on 1 January 1987. In a career spanning over 30 years, he has held important operational, staff and dockyard appointments.

References 

Year of birth missing (living people)
Living people
IIT Kharagpur alumni
Indian Navy admirals
Defence Services Staff College alumni
National Defence College, India alumni